The 2020 Dutch Open (officially referred to as the 2020 Bauhaus Dutch Open) was the 48th edition of the Dutch Open organised by the World Darts Federation and Nederlandse Darts Bond (Dutch Darts Association). The tournament was held at the De Bonte Wever in Assen, Netherlands. Tournament has been awarded Platinum ranking status, with a total prize fund €27,650.

On 29 November 2019, Nederlandse Darts Bond received a letter from the British Darts Organisation with several new obligations to tournament regulations. The Nederlandse Darts Bond does not accept the new rules and is not going to pay for BDO points. Since 2020 tournament is no longer BDO ranked.

Ross Montgomery and Aileen de Graaf won men's and women's tournaments respectively. This edition was biggest darts open tournament in 2020, where over 5 thousand players took part. Montgomery claimed the men's singles title with a 3–1 win over Brian Raman, lifting the trophy for the second time in his career.

Men's

Draw

Women's

Draw

Youth's

Seeds
Seeding was take place in accordance of the WDF Rankings. The players was seeded in accordance with WDF regulations, but not always as the first match in the section. The first byes go to the seeded players, but after that the byes are equally divided across the sheets in a random place on the sheet.

Draw

Girls

Seeds
Seeding was take place in accordance of the WDF Rankings. The players was seeded in accordance with WDF regulations, but not always as the first match in the section. The first byes go to the seeded players, but after that the byes are equally divided across the sheets in a random place on the sheet.

  (Champion)
  (Semi-finals)

Draw

References

Dutch Open
Dutch Open
Dutch Open